The Yugoslav-Hungarian Boundary Commission was the main body in charge of defining the new frontier between Hungary and the Kingdom of Serbs, Croats and Slovenes after the First World War, following the Paris Peace Conference and the dissolution of Austria-Hungary.

History
In 1920 the Treaty of Trianon ratified the decision to defined the independent Hungarian state new borders with its neighboring states. The Yugoslav-Hungarian Boundary Commission was tasked with defining a definitive delimitation between the two states. The commission work involved studies from lawyers, historians, geographers and other members of the academic community, in order to prepare border documentation, on the basis of Article 29 of the Peace Treaty.
Article 43 provided the legal framework for the formation and work of this Commission:

The British delegate Lt. Col. David Cree was appointed as its chairman, the other members were Col. Luigi Valvassori (Italy), Lt Col. Maurice Marminia (France), Lt. Col. Yanagawa Heisuke (Japan) while Col. Károly Vassel and Col. Vojin Čolak-Antić represented respectively Hungary and the Kingdom of the Serbs, Croats and Slovenes.

By the Treaty's conclusions, Hungary ceded the regions of western Banat, Bačka, Međimurje and Prekmurje to the Kingdom of Serbs, Croats and Slovenes. The region of Baranja, with its administrative seat of government in the town of Pécs, was divided with the southern part annexed to the Kingdom of SCS according to a new boundary line, the so-called Clemenceau line. The city of Varaždin in Croatia was chosen as the seat of the border commission, the Commission met for the first time in Paris in the rooms of the Geographic Service of the French Army on 1 August 1921, a further meeting was organised for 18 August 1921. In November 1922 the six members of the Border Commission signed the border list.

Many historians and scholars agree that the definition of the Yugoslav-Hungarian border was a major reason for the stabilization of Europe after the First World War and the establishment of a new regional balance.

References

Sources

External links 
 Lt. Colonel Cree. “Yugoslav-Hungarian Boundary Commission.” The Geographical Journal, vol. 65, no. 2, 1925,
 Lt. Col. Yanagawa Heisuke. A Japanese Account of the Yugoslav-Hungarian Border Commission’s Activities

1908 establishments in France
Intergovernmental organizations established by treaty